Armatophallus indicus is a moth of the family Gelechiidae. It is found in India (Rajasthan).

The wingspan is about 12 mm for males and 14.6 mm for females. The forewings are covered with brown black-tipped scales. The costal margin is mottled with black and there are two black spots at the base, a diffuse black spot in the middle at one-fourth, an indistinct black streak in the fold and a subtriangular black spot at three-fourths of the costal margin. The apex is uniform brown without black scales, separated by poorly expressed whitish spots at the dorsal and costal margin. The hindwings are light grey. Adults have been recorded on wing in late November.

Etymology
The species name refers to the distribution of the species.

References

Moths described in 2015
Armatophallus